"Only Over You" is a song by the British-American rock band Fleetwood Mac from their 1982 album Mirage. It was written by Christine McVie for her boyfriend at the time, the Beach Boys' drummer Dennis Wilson. The record sleeve states, "With thanks to Dennis Wilson for inspiration."  Biographer Jon Stebbins characterized the song as McVie's "last declaration of love" toward Wilson.

Release
"Only Over You" was released as the sixth track on their 1982 album Mirage. In the UK, the song was issued as the B-side to their single "Oh Diane". An alternate mix of "Only Over You" was included on the 2016 deluxe reissue of Mirage.

Influence
In 2009, musician Daniel Lopatin (credited as "sunsetcorp") reworked "Only Over You" as a hypnagogic pop music video titled "angel".

References

1982 songs
Fleetwood Mac songs
Songs written by Christine McVie
Songs about the Beach Boys
Dennis Wilson